Gavin Wright (born 1943) is an economic historian and the William Robertson Coe Professor of American economic history at Stanford University. He received his B.A from Swarthmore College and his Ph.D. with distinction from Yale University. He has taught at that institution, the University of Michigan, the University of California at Berkeley, the University of Cambridge, and Oxford University.

Wright has published nine books and dozens of scholarly articles. Most of his research has focused on the economics of U.S. Civil War and the Civil Rights Movement.

Selected publications 
Reckoning with Slavery. Oxford, England: Oxford U. Press, 1976 (co-ed).
The Political Economy of the Cotton South: Households, Markets, and Wealth in the Nineteenth Century. New York: W. W. Norton, 1978. .
Technique, Spirit and Form in the Making of Modern Economies. Bingley, England: JAI Press, 1984 (c-ed).
Old South, New South: Revolutions in the Southern Economy Since the Civil War. New York: Basic Books, 1986. .
The Mosaic of Economic Growth. Stanford U. Press, 1996 (co-ed). .
Slavery and American Economic Development. Baton Rouge: Louisiana State University Press, 2006. .
The Japanese Economy in Retrospect. Hackensack, NJ: World Scientific, 2010 (co-ed).
Sharing the Prize: The Economics of the Civil Rights Revolution in the American South.  Cambridge: Harvard University Press, 2013.  .

References

External links 
 Stanford faculty bio
 SIEPR bio

1943 births
Living people
Historians of the American Civil War
Economic historians
21st-century American historians
21st-century American male writers
Stanford University Department of Economics faculty
University of Michigan faculty
21st-century American economists
American male non-fiction writers
Presidents of the Economic History Association